Reza Zarkhanli (born 22 March 1973) is an Iranian professional futsal coach and former player. He is currently head coach of Safir Gofteman in the Iranian Futsal Super League.

Honours

Managerial 

 Iran Futsal's 1st Division
 Champions (3): 2010–11 (Misagh) - 2016–17 (Moghavemat Qarchak) - 2019–20 (Foodka)

Notes and references

1973 births
Living people
Iranian men's futsal players
Iranian futsal coaches